For Italian football transfers summer 2012 see the following articles:
List of Italian football transfers summer 2012 (co-ownership)
List of Italian football transfers summer 2012 (July)
List of Italian football transfers summer 2012 (August)

Tran
2012
Italy